Claudia Heill (24 January 1982 – 31 March 2011) was an Austrian judoka best known for winning the silver medal in the half-middleweight (63 kg) division at the 2004 Summer Olympics.

Biography
In addition to her success at the 2004 Summer Olympics, Heill won silver medals at the European championship in 2001 and 2005 and bronze medals in 2002, 2003 and 2007. She placed fifth at the 2008 Summer Olympics and retired one year later. After retiring from competition, she began coaching junior judoka.

Heill in 1998 aged 16 won the -63 kg category at the Senior Austrian National Championships. Later that same year Heill won silver at the Junior World Championships (Cali) where she lost to the Japanese Maeda Keiko. Within a month Heill took the gold medal at the Junior European Championships (Bucharest). Heill’s position as a world-class judoka in the -63 kg category was developing quickly. In 2000, at the Junior World Championships (Nabul) she won bronze and at the Junior European Championships (Nicosia) she won silver. By 2001, Heill began concentrating on her senior career and she took a silver medal in the European Championships (Paris) and placed fifth at the World Championships (Munich).

Heill spent the next seven years competing internationally. She was one of four Austrians (Sabrina Filzmoser, Ludwig Paischer and Andreas Mitterfellner making up the quartet) to take gold medals at the World Military Championships in 2006 helping her country top the medal table. Her finest hour was her silver medal-winning performance at the Olympic Games in Athens in 2004. “This had been her dream even as she began practicing her first judo attacks as a seven-year-old,” said her longtime coach Hubert Rohrauer. Heill was part of the organizing committee at the European Championships in Vienna in 2010.  

Heill committed suicide by jumping to her death from a 6th-story window in Vienna on March 31st, 2011. Shortly before her death, Heill was a commentator on JudoTV at the Judo World Cup in Oberwart.  Her former teammate Ludwig Paischer was stunned by her tragic death, saying, "She was such a fun-loving, friendly person."

External links

References

1982 births
2011 suicides
Suicides by jumping in Austria
Austrian female judoka
Judoka at the 2004 Summer Olympics
Judoka at the 2008 Summer Olympics
Olympic judoka of Austria
Olympic silver medalists for Austria
Olympic medalists in judo
Sportspeople from Vienna
Medalists at the 2004 Summer Olympics
20th-century Austrian women
21st-century Austrian women